Angamos Island (Spanish: Isla Angamos) is an island in the Magallanes and Chilean Antarctica Region, Chile located between Ladrillero, Machado and Hernán Gallego Channels.

Islands of Magallanes Region